Boraria is a genus of flat-backed millipedes in the family Xystodesmidae. There are about seven described species in Boraria.

Species
These seven species belong to the genus Boraria:
 Boraria carolina (Chamberlin, 1939)
 Boraria deturkiana (Causey, 1942)
 Boraria geniculata Chamberlin
 Boraria infesta (Chamberlin, 1918)
 Boraria media (Chamberlin, 1918)
 Boraria profuga (Causey, 1955)
 Boraria stricta (Brölemann, 1896)

References

Further reading

External links

 

Polydesmida
Articles created by Qbugbot